Mamadou Kané (born 22 January 1997) is a Guinean professional footballer who plays as a midfielder for Cypriot club Pafos, on loan from Greek side Olympiacos, and the Guinea national team.

Club career

Neftçi 
Kané began his career with Gangan before signing with Azerbaijan Premier League side Neftçi on 1 January 2019. He made his professional debut with Neftçi in a 1–0 league win over Qarabağ FK on 3 February 2019.Kané was named the player of the year in Azerbaijan by the famous Ghanaian football player Michael Essien in the 2019-20 season with his successful performance in Neftçi.

Olympiacos 
On 28 August 2021, Olympiacos officially announced Mamadou Kané for a transfer fee in the range of €300,000, who signed a five-year contract with the Greek giants.

Loan to Neftçi 
On 29 August 2021, Olympiacos loaned Kané to Neftçi for one season.

Return to Olympiacos 
On 26 January 2022, Kané left Neftçi and returned to Olympiacos.

Loan to Pafos 
On 23 August 2022, he was loaned to Cypriot club Pafos for one year.

International career
Kané made his debut with the Guinea national team in a 1–1 2020 African Nations Championship draw with Chad on 15 November 2020. Kané scored his first goal for Guinea against Namibia on 28 March 2021.

Career statistics

Club

International

Honours

Neftçi

Azerbaijan Premier League: 2020–21

Olympiacos

Super League Greece: 2021–22

References

External links
 
 
 
 Footballdatabase Profile

1997 births
Sportspeople from Conakry
Living people
Guinean footballers
Guinea international footballers
Guinea youth international footballers
Association football midfielders
Satellite FC players
AS Kaloum Star players
Neftçi PFK players
Olympiacos F.C. players
Olympiacos F.C. B players
Pafos FC players
Guinée Championnat National players
Azerbaijan Premier League players
Super League Greece players
Super League Greece 2 players
Cypriot First Division players
Guinean expatriate footballers
Guinean expatriate sportspeople in Azerbaijan
Expatriate footballers in Azerbaijan
Guinean expatriates in Greece
Guinean expatriate sportspeople in Greece
Expatriate footballers in Greece
Guinean expatriates in Cyprus
Guinean expatriate sportspeople in Cyprus
Expatriate footballers in Cyprus
2021 Africa Cup of Nations players